A landline telephone is attached to the telephone network by a cable.

Landline (or Land Line, Land-Line) may also refer to:

 Landline (TV series), on matters in rural Australia
 Landline (film), a 2017 comedy film
 Landline (novel), a 2014 sci-fi novel by Rainbow Rowell
 Land-Line, a former dataset from the Ordnance Survey, the UK mapping body
 Land Line Magazine, for American truckers